The 2020 Davis Cup World Group I Play-offs were held on 6–9 March. The twelve winners of this round qualified for the 2020 Davis Cup World Group I while the twelve losers qualified for the 2020 Davis Cup World Group II.

Teams
Twenty-four teams played for twelve spots in the World Group I, in series decided on a home and away basis.

These twenty-four teams are:
 12 losing teams from their Group I zone.
 12 winning teams from their Group II zone.

The 12 winning teams from the play-offs would play at the World Group I and the 12 losing teams would play at the World Group II.

Seeded teams
 
 
 
 
 
 
 
 
 
 
 
 

Unseeded teams

Results summary

China withdrew from its match against Romania because of the COVID-19 pandemic.

World Group I Play-offs results

Ukraine vs. Chinese Taipei

Pakistan vs. Slovenia

Bolivia vs. Dominican Republic

Turkey vs. Israel

Bosnia and Herzegovina vs. South Africa

Mexico vs. Finland

Lebanon vs. Thailand

New Zealand vs. Venezuela

Peru vs. Switzerland

Norway vs. Barbados

Lithuania vs. Portugal

Romania vs. China

Notes

References

External links

World Group
Davis Cup World Group I Play-offs 2020